The Leray projection, named after Jean Leray, is a linear operator used in the theory of partial differential equations, specifically in the fields of fluid dynamics. Informally, it can be seen as the projection on the divergence-free vector fields. It is used in particular to eliminate both the pressure term and the divergence-free term in the Stokes equations and Navier–Stokes equations.

Definition

By pseudo-differential approach

For vector fields  (in any dimension ), the Leray projection  is defined by
 
This definition must be understood in the sense of pseudo-differential operators: its matrix valued Fourier multiplier  is given by
 
Here,  is the Kronecker delta. Formally, it means that for all , one has
 
where  is the Schwartz space. We use here the Einstein notation for the summation.

By Helmholtz–Leray decomposition

One can show that a given vector field  can be decomposed as
 
Different than the usual Helmholtz decomposition, the
additive constant for  ). Then we can define  as
 
The Leray projector is defined similarly on function spaces other than the Schwartz space, and on different domains with different boundary conditions. The four properties listed below will continue to hold in those cases.

Properties

The Leray projection has the following properties:
 The Leray projection is a projection:   for all .
 The Leray projection is a divergence-free operator:  for all .
 The Leray projection is simply the identity for the divergence-free vector fields:   for all  such that .
 The Leray projection vanishes for the vector fields coming from a potential:   for all .

Application to Navier–Stokes equations

The incompressible Navier–Stokes equations are the partial differential equations given by
 
 
where  is the velocity of the fluid,  the pressure,  the viscosity and  the external volumetric force.

 
where we have defined the Stokes operator  and the bilinear form  by 
 
The pressure and the divergence free condition are "projected away". In general, we assume for simplicity that  is divergence free, so that ; this can always be done, by adding the term  to the pressure.

References 

Differential equations
Fluid dynamics